Jorge Daniel Casanova (born July 26, 1976, in Sauce, Uruguay) is a former Uruguayan professional football player and current manager.

Teams
  Bella Vista 1995–1999
  Lecce 1999–2000
  Ravenna 2001
  Peñarol 2002
  Bella Vista 2002–2003
  Chacarita Juniors 2004–2005
  Unión de Santa Fe 2005
  Bella Vista 2006–2007
  Atlético Bucaramanga 2007–2008
  Once Caldas 2008–2009
  Atlético Junior 2009–2010
  Bella Vista 2011–2013

Teams as a coach
  Sud América 2014–2015 (assistant manager)
  C.S.D. Villa Española 2015–2017
  Águila 2017 
  Bella Vista 2020-present

Honors
  Once Caldas 2008 (Copa Columbia, Runner Up)
  Once Caldas 2009 (Torneo Apertura, Copa Mustang)
  Atlético Junior 2010 (Torneo Apertura, Copa Mustang)

References

External links
 
 

1976 births
Living people
People from Canelones Department
Uruguayan footballers
Uruguayan expatriate footballers
Uruguay international footballers
C.A. Bella Vista players
Peñarol players
Once Caldas footballers
U.S. Lecce players
Ravenna F.C. players
Atlético Junior footballers
Unión de Santa Fe footballers
Chacarita Juniors footballers
Atlético Bucaramanga footballers
Uruguayan Primera División players
Categoría Primera A players
Serie B players
Expatriate footballers in Argentina
Expatriate footballers in Colombia
Expatriate footballers in Italy
Association football midfielders
C.A. Bella Vista managers